Stenoterommata quena is a species of mygalomorph spiders of Argentina, named after its type locality: La Quena, Salta Province. Females are recognized by the numerous (7 or more) spines on prolateral patella III. The rastellum is stronger, and the maxillae are shorter, than in other species of its genus. The presence of preening combs in metatarsi I is also unusual.

Description
Female: total length ; cephalothorax length , width ; cephalic region length , width ; fovea width ; labium length , width ; sternum length , width . Its cephalic region is convex with fovea procurved. The labium has no cuspules. Its maxillae are rather short, and serrula are absent. Its sternal sigilla is shallowand submarginal; it has a rebordered sternum. Chelicerae: rastellum strong, formed by thick blunt setae. Its cephalothorax, legs and palpi reddish brown; abdomen yellowish with brown chevron.

Distribution
They are found in a thorn forest habitat in northeastern Salta Province, Argentina. Specimens were collected from burrows similar to those of other species in the genus, with an open entrance lined with a dense layer of silk.

See also
Spider anatomy
Iguazú National Park

References

External links
 ITIS entry
 ADW entry
EOL entry
BioLib entry

Pycnothelidae
Spiders of Argentina
Spiders described in 1995